The Alexandra General Hospital is a General hospital in central Athens, Greece. It was established in 1954, initially as a Maternity Hospital and later as a Maternity & Obstetrics - Gynecological Hospital. It is located at Vassilisis Sofias avenue in the center of Athens. It is named after Princess Alexandra, the daughter of King George I, who became the Grand Duchess of Russia before dying during labour.

References 

Hospitals in Athens
Central Athens (regional unit)
1954 establishments in Greece
Hospital buildings completed in 1954
Hospitals established in 1954